Lister Drive power station was a series of generating stations that supplied electricity to the City of Liverpool and the wider area from 1900 until 1980. They were owned and collaboratively operated by Liverpool Corporation and Marcus Kemp Coal Limited until the nationalisation of the British electricity supply industry in 1948. The power station was developed in several phases: designated No. 1, No. 2, and No. 3 stations. A gas turbine station was commissioned in March 1965.

Equipment specification

Plant in 1923
In 1923 the plant comprised:

 Boilers, producing 1,000,000 lb/h (126 kg/s) of steam supplying:
 Steam turbine generating sets:
 6 × 2,000 kW AC
 2 × 3,500 kW AC
 2 × 6,000 kW AC
 1 × 10,000 kW AC
 2 × 12,500 kW AC
 2 × 2,000 kW DC

The total output was 66.0 MW AC and 4.0 MW DC.

No. 3 power station
The No. 3 Station was constructed in 1926–28 and comprised:

 Boilers:
 2 × 60,000 lb/h (7.6 kg/s) Yarrow, stoker fired
 4 × 60,000 lb/h (7.6 kg/s) Babcock and Wilcox, stoker fired
 2 × 125,000 lb/h (15.75 kg/s) Babcock and Wilcox, pulverised fuel fired
 The working pressure of the boilers was 325 psi at 700°F (22.4 bar, 371°C).
 Turbo-alternators:
 2 × 25 MW Metropolitan-Vickers turbo-alternator generating at 6.3 kV, each with a 375 kW 480 V DC auxiliary generator.
 Cooling towers:
 5 × Henshaw cooling towers each with a capacity of 2.615 million gallons per hour (3.302 m3/sec). These were the first ferro-concrete hyperbolic cooling tower in the UK. The Lister Drive towers were 39.6 m high and 30.5 m in diameter at the base.

Coal was delivered to Lister Drive via sidings from the adjacent Edge Hill and Bootle railway line.

A range of electricity supplies were available (in 1923) to consumers: 

 3-phase, 50 Hz AC at 230 and 400 Volts.
 DC 230 and 460 V
 DC Traction current 500 V

Other Liverpool power stations
Lister Drive was the principal power station serving Liverpool. There were other power stations connected to the system supplying electricity to the City.

In 1923 there were five rubbish destructors burning trade and domestic refuse, the steam raised in the destructor furnaces drove steam turbines. There were 7 × 100 kW, 2 × 150 kW, 5 × 200 kW, and 1 × 500 kW machines generating a DC supply. The total generating capacity was 2.5 MW.

Clarence Dock power station was constructed for Liverpool Corporation in 1931 to be an integral part of the local electricity grid system supplying, in conjunction with Lister Drive, electricity throughout Liverpool.

In 1965 two 56 MW fuel oil fired English Electric gas turbines were installed at Lister Drive. Each machine had two power turbines coupled to alternators. The gas turbines were used to meet peak demand.

Operations

Operating data 1921–23
The operating data for the period 1921–23 is shown in the table:

There was a significant growth of demand and use of electricity in this period.

Under the terms of the Electricity (Supply) Act 1926 (16-17 Geo. 5 c. 51) the Central Electricity Board (CEB) was established in 1926. The CEB identified high efficiency ‘selected’ power stations that would supply electricity most effectively; Lister Drive was designated a selected station. The CEB also constructed the national grid (1927–33) to connect power stations within a region. Lister Drive power station was connected to an electricity grid ring which included Southport, Preston (Ribble), Warrington and Wigan (Westwood); this was one of three electricity rings in the North West. The others were Bolton, Padiham, Rawtenstall and Kearsley power stations ring; and the third was Manchester, Oldham, Tame Valley and Stockport ring.

Operating data 1946
Lister Drive power station operating data for 1946 is shown in the table.

The British electricity supply industry was nationalised in 1948 under the provisions of the Electricity Act 1947 (10-11 Geo. 6 c. 54). The Liverpool Corporation electricity undertaking was abolished, ownership of Lister Drive power station was vested in the British Electricity Authority, and subsequently the Central Electricity Authority and the Central Electricity Generating Board (CEGB). At the same time the electricity distribution and sales responsibilities of the Liverpool Corporation electricity undertaking were transferred to the Merseyside and North Wales Electricity Board (MANWEB).

Operating data 1954–79
Operating data for the period 1954–79 is shown in the table:

The plant was used less intensive over the period 1954–62 as its thermal efficiency decreased and Liverpool used electricity from the national grid.

Closure
Lister Drive power station was decommissioned in about 1981. The buildings were subsequently demolished and the area has been redeveloped. The cooling towers were demolished on 8 May 1994. A 275 kV substation is still operational east of the former power station site.

See also
 Timeline of the UK electricity supply industry
 List of power stations in England
 Bromborough power station
 Percival Lane power station 
 Manweb Remembered

References

Coal-fired power stations in England
Demolished power stations in the United Kingdom
Former power stations in England
Buildings and structures in Liverpool